Niphoparmena elongata is a species of beetle in the family Cerambycidae. It was described by Stephan von Breuning in 1939.

It's 7½ mm long and 2½ mm wide, and its type locality is the Rwenzori Mountains .

References

elongata
Beetles described in 1939
Taxa named by Stephan von Breuning (entomologist)